Themroc is a 1973 French satirical film by director Claude Faraldo. It was produced by François de Lannurien and Helène Vager and its original music was composed by Harald Maury. Made on a low budget with no intelligible dialog, Themroc tells the story of a French blue collar worker who rebels against modern society, reverting into an urban caveman. The film's scenes of incest and cannibalism earned it adults-only ratings. It was the first film to be shown in the UK's Channel 4's red triangle series of controversial films in 1986. It has become a cult film.

Main cast
Michel Piccoli as Themroc
Béatrice Romand as Sister of Themroc
Marilù Tolo as Superior shapely secretary
Francesca Romana Coluzzi as Female neighbor
Jeanne Herviale as Mother
Patrick Dewaere as A police officer
Coluche as Male neighbor
Miou-Miou as the young neighbor

Sources

External links

 

1973 films
1970s French-language films
1973 comedy films
French satirical films
French political satire films
French avant-garde and experimental films
Films without speech
Incest in film
Films about cannibalism
Films directed by Claude Faraldo
1970s avant-garde and experimental films
Films about cavemen
1970s French films